Caner Koca (born 14 April 1996) is a Turkish footballer who plays as a defensive midfielder for Karacabey Belediyespor.

Club career 

Koca is a youth exponent from Fenerbahçe S.K. He made his Süper Lig debut at 31 May 2015 against Kasımpaşa SK. He replaced Dirk Kuyt in extra time in a 2-0 home win.

International career

Caner debuted for the Turkey U21 team in a 1-0 loss to Germany U21 on 10 November 2016.

References

1996 births
Sportspeople from İzmit
Living people
Turkish footballers
Turkey under-21 international footballers
Association football midfielders
Fenerbahçe S.K. footballers
Samsunspor footballers
Kırklarelispor footballers
Sakaryaspor footballers
Şanlıurfaspor footballers
Karacabey Belediyespor footballers
Süper Lig players
TFF First League players
TFF Second League players